Huaning Road is a station on Line 5 of the Shanghai Metro. Passengers can transfer to the main line at Dongchuan Road. However, since 26 December 2020, this is not the case, as trains have resumed service all the way to Xinzhuang.

References 

Railway stations in Shanghai
Shanghai Metro stations in Minhang District
Railway stations in China opened in 2003
Line 5, Shanghai Metro